Lynn Walford is a Los Angeles writer, editor, copywriter and author. Her work includes numerous news stories, feature articles, brochures, online media,  magazine articles and a book. Her most recent feature articles focus on connected cars, technology, wireless, financial technology, mobile content, and business.

Walford graduated from Pomona College and is the former treasurer of The Book Publicists of Southern California. She was formerly on the board of directors of the Independent Writers of Southern California. She presently runs Freelance Writer Now and writes freelance articles for major automotive technology publications.

Bibliography
AUTO Connected Car News: as executive editor of AUTO Connected Car News, Walford is best known for her coverage of events and creating the Tech CARS Awards for technology innovators in the connected car space.

Auto Futures from DMA Media, Lynn Walford as contributing editor has contributed a multitude of articles. including articles about batteries and the future of automotive. She interviewed Jay Leno and other important auto futurists.  Why the Future is Electric, Transforming Personal Mobility: InMotion USA’s Rose Song Wang and many more.
GearBrain: How to Track Employees and Teens
AUTO Connected Car - Executive Editor
Cars.com: Self-Installing Robotic Infant Seat, How to Use a Backup Camera Correctly, Nissan Shutters Leaf App After Remote Hacking, Monitoring Devices Allow Parents to Keep Eye on Teen Driving.
Yahoo Autos: How Can I Play Music from My Phone in the car without Bluetooth or an Input?, Why Does It Seem Like I Can’t Trust Car Dealers?, Can I Drive on Bald Tires?, Which Kid Should I Stick in the Middle Seat? Yahoo Autos Question of the Day Author
Motor Matters Tech Out My New Ride: Author
Automotive IT News, Author of car tech articles]
TechHive Car Tech Author
Wireless and Mobile News - Executive Editor
Make Money with Your PC, Ten Speed Press, 1994.
Wireless Week - Gesture Technology Article
ATM Marketplace
Digital Signage Today
Mobile Content Writers
ISO&Agent
Investor's Business Daily (1998-2002)
The Los Angeles Times
Success
Compute
The Office
PC Laptop
HomePC
FamilyPC
New Age Journal
Income Opportunities

Awards
Lynn Walford was awarded the honor of Advanced Communicator Gold by Toastmasters International in 2015.
Walford wrote the first-prize winning entry for Consumer Electronics Show Best of CES 2004.
She also the winner of the Alameda Writers Group "25 Words or Less" very short writing contests 2002-2004.

References

Sources
Ten Speed Press
Insider Pages review

External links
Independent Writers of Southern California

Living people
Writers from California
Pomona College alumni
21st-century American writers
21st-century American women writers
Year of birth missing (living people)